Charmaine Bennell is a Noongar author and illustrator from Western Australia. Her published books are written in the Noongar language, the language of Indigenous Australians in the South West of Western Australia. She is the daughter of Glen and Phyllis Bennell (née Wallam) and was born in Pingelly. When she was a child her family moved to Bunbury.

Charmaine was a Noongar language teacher at Djidi Djidi Aboriginal School in Bunbury and is now studying for a Bachelor of Arts of Indigenous Languages and Linguistics degree.
While working at Sister Kate's, Charmaine started the Languages Other than English program to teach Noongar. She is passionate about saving and teaching the Noongar language.

Author

Illustrator

 
 
 

 Waakarl kardakoor bilya-k = The Rainbow Serpent from Blackwood River / storyteller, Lorraine Smith-Marshall ; original illustrations, Sonya Khan ; audio storytelling, Charmaine Bennell ; language consultants, Lois Sphen-Jackson ... et al. ; English editor, Maree Klesch
 Moort family reader series / concept: Denise Smith-Ali, Gloria Dann, Charmaine Bennel, Maree Klesch ; English text : Maree Klesch ; Noongar translations : Lois Spehn-Jackson ; illustrations: Marissa Clausen

References

Living people
Noongar language
Noongar people
Australian women writers
Indigenous Australian writers
Writers from Western Australia
Australian illustrators
Australian women illustrators
Year of birth missing (living people)
People from Pingelly, Western Australia
Language teachers